The 1947 South Australian state election was held on 8 March 1947.

Retiring Members

Labor

 Bob Dale, MHA (Adelaide)

LCL

 Archibald McDonald, MHA (Burra)
 Frank Smith, MHA (Glenelg)

House of Assembly
Sitting members are shown in bold text. Successful candidates are highlighted in the relevant colour. Where there is possible confusion, an asterisk (*) is also used.

Legislative Council
Sitting members are shown in bold text. Successful candidates are highlighted in the relevant colour and identified by an asterisk (*).

References

Candidates for South Australian state elections
1940 elections in Australia
1940s in South Australia